North Carolina's 97th House district is one of 120 districts in the North Carolina House of Representatives. It has been represented by Republican Jason Saine since 2011.

Geography
Since 2003, the district has included all of Lincoln County. The district overlaps with the 44th Senate district.

District officeholders

Election results

2022

2020

2018

2016

2014

2012

2010

2008

2006

2004

2002

2000

References

North Carolina House districts
Lincoln County, North Carolina